Andeline is an American experimental Indie (music) band that formed in Edmond, Oklahoma in 2004.

Andeline first started as the creation of high school friends Ryan Ainsworth and Jason McManus.  Drew Housley was employed on the guitar and stuck with the band until his departure in late 2004.  His replacement was Andeline current, Sammy Mitchell.
 	 
In 2004 they self-released an EP titled Based on a Story, which had a very limited print run and was only sold at live appearances. 	 
In 2005, Andeline signed with Independent Artists Alliance and released their second album, "Transponder Down" (2005), which was widely acclaimed and received attention on the multinational level.

Andeline differentiated from the music scene in part by the fact that they produced all material solely by themselves.  "Transponder Down" was completely self-recorded by Andeline and produced by Guitarist Ryan Ainsworth and Drummer Jason McManus.  The artwork for "Transponder Down" was created by McManus as well.
 	
As of February 2006, Andeline had decided to separate.

Trivia
The band members have known each other since high school. 	  	
Many Andeline songs are based on Christian values.
Most all Andeline merchandise is completely manufactured by the band members themselves.

Group members
Zebedee Geautreaux (vocals) 	
Jason McManus (drums/vocals) 	
Blake Evans (bass) 	
Sammy Mitchell (guitar)
Ryan Ainsworth (guitar)
Drew Housley (guitar) (ex 2004-2005)

Albums
Based on a Story (EP) (2004) 	  	
Transponder Down (2005)

External links
The Andeline Website 	
Andeline Interview on Independent Clauses
The Official Andeline Myspace  	
Andeline on Purevolume

Musical groups from Oklahoma
Musical groups established in 2004
Alternative rock groups from Oklahoma
Rock music groups from Oklahoma